"Not in Love" is a song by Spanish singer Enrique Iglesias. The song was written by Iglesias, Paul Barry, Victoria Horn, Mark Taylor, Sheppard Solomon, and Fernando Garibay for Iglesias' seventh studio album, 7 (2003). The album version features Iglesias's vocals only, with the radio mix featuring an extra verse and chorus by American singer Kelis. "Not in Love" was released as the album's second and final single in February 2004 and peaked within the top 10 of the charts in the Czech Republic, Denmark, Greece, Ireland, the Netherlands, Norway, Romania, and the United Kingdom.

Music video
The music video was directed by Jake Nava and filmed in Los Angeles, California. The video opens with Iglesias and Kelis outside a busy nightclub and Iglesias enters the club first while Kelis waits on a motorbike. Once inside, Iglesias meets up with his gang at the bar and soon makes his way to the stage where he performs the song backed by a live band. Meanwhile, Kelis appears in sequences by herself or tantalizing Iglesias around various areas of the club.

Track listings
UK CD1
 "Not in Love" (radio mix) – 3:43
 "Maybe" (Mark Taylor version) – 3:10

UK CD2
 "Not in Love" (radio mix) – 3:43
 "Maybe" (Mark Taylor extended mix) – 5:10
 "Not in Love" (Dave Audé extended mix) – 7:07
 "Not in Love" (video) – 3:43

US
 "Not in Love" (radio mix) – 3:43
 "Not in Love" (Dave Audé vocal edit) – 6:08
 "Addicted" (The Scumfrog radio edit) – 4:37
 "Addicted" (Fernando Garibay radio edit) – 3:45

Credits and personnel
Information retrieved from CD liner notes
 Written By: Enrique Iglesias, Paul Barry, Mark Taylor, Fernando Garibay, Sheppard Solomon, Victoria Horn (+Kelis Rogers on radio mix)
 Lead vocals: Enrique Iglesias (+Kelis on radio mix)
 Producer: Mark Taylor
 Co-producers: Enrique Iglesias, Fernando Garibay
 Mixed By: Mark Taylor, Ren Swan
 Engineer: Carlos Paucer, Ren Swan, Jason Stasium, Tim Olmstead
 Guitars, Keyboards, Programming: Fernando Garibay
 Additional Guitars: Adam Phillips, Charles Fearing
 Background vocals: Enrique Iglesias, Paul Barry, Steve Lee, Sylvia Mason-James

Charts and certifications

Weekly charts

Year-end charts

Certifications

Release history

See also
 Number-one dance hits of 2004 (USA)

References

2003 songs
2004 singles
Enrique Iglesias songs
Kelis songs
Music videos directed by Jake Nava
Song recordings produced by Mark Taylor (record producer)
Songs written by Enrique Iglesias
Songs written by Fernando Garibay
Songs written by Mark Taylor (record producer)
Songs written by Paul Barry (songwriter)
Songs written by Sheppard Solomon
Songs written by Victoria Horn